The Barrett XM500 is a gas-operated, semi-automatic, anti materiel/sniper rifle currently in development by the Barrett Firearms Company.  It is fed by a 10-round detachable box magazine situated behind the trigger in bullpup configuration.

Based on the design of the Barrett M82/M107, it is intended to be a lighter, more compact alternative. Since the XM500 has a stationary barrel (instead of the recoiling-barrel design of the M82), it will likely have somewhat better accuracy. As with its predecessor, it comes with a removable, adjustable bipod mounted under the barrel, and a top-mounted Picatinny rail for attachment of a scope or other accessory.

See also
List of bullpup firearms
List of sniper rifles
Barrett M95
MACS M3
Dragunov SVU
OSV-96
Gepard GM6 Lynx
Barrett XM109

References

External links
 

.50 BMG sniper rifles
Barrett firearms
Bullpup rifles
Rifles of the United States
Semi-automatic rifles
Anti-materiel rifles